Vaivari is a residential area and neighbourhood of the city Jūrmala, Latvia. National Rehabilitation Centre "Vaivari" is located there.

History 

The Vaivari  railway station was established in 1927, originally named Asari II. It was renamed Vaivari in 1938.

References

External links 

Neighbourhoods in Jūrmala